Edgar Ravenswood Waite (5 May 1866 – 19 January 1928) was a British/Australian zoologist, ichthyologist, herpetologist, and ornithologist.

Waite was born in Leeds, Yorkshire, England, the second son of John Waite, a bank clerk, 
and his wife Jane, née Vause.  Waite was educated at Leeds Parish Church Middle Class School and at the Victoria University of Manchester. In 1888 he was appointed sub-curator of the Leeds Museum and three years later was made curator. On 7 April 1892 Waite married Rose Edith Green at St. Matthew's parish church, Leeds.
In 1893 Waite became zoologist at the Australian Museum, Sydney, he was the Fish Curator there from 1893 to 1906.

Waite accompanied Charles Hedley of the Australian Museum on the 1896 Funafuti Coral Reef Boring Expedition of the Royal Society under Professor William Sollas and Professor Edgeworth David. Following the expedition to Funafuti in the Ellice Islands (now known as Tuvalu) Waite published an account of The mammals, reptiles, and fishes of Funafuti.

In the scientific discipline of herpetology he described several new species of reptiles. In 1898 Waite published Popular Account of Australian Snakes.

He was with the trawling expedition conducted by the H.M.C.S Thetis and wrote the report on the fish, and he also reported on the fish trawled by the Western Australian government. He was involved in several expeditions to sub-Anatarctic islands - including the 1907 Sub-Antarctic Islands Scientific Expedition, New Guinea, and the Australian interior. By the time Waite's employment ended at the Australian Museum, the collection contained 18,000 specimens. He was later the Curator of the Canterbury Museum in New Zealand for eight years, before accepting the Directorship at the South Australian Museum in March 1914.

Waite was the first Australian ichthyologist to use detailed illustrations in his papers. During his career, he published around 140 papers, more than half were on fish. His major contribution to Australian ichthyology was The Fishes of South Australia (1923).

In 1926 Waite spent time studying European and American museums; while in New York City he arranged the Australian section of a museum there. He had contracted malaria while in New Guinea, and suffered from poor health from that time. Waite died on 19 January 1928 in Highbury Hospital, Hobart from enteric fever while at Hobart attending a meeting of the Australasian Association for the Advancement of Science. He was not related to Peter Waite, whose endowment made the Waite Institute a reality.

Although of a retiring disposition, Waite was a man of great versatility. He was a linguist and musician, could draw and paint in water-colour, was an expert modeller, had some knowledge of mechanics, and was a capable photographer. Most of these things were useful in his work as curator of a museum, and as such his reputation stood very high. As a scientist his most important work was on the vertebrates. He was a fellow of the Linnean Society from an early age, and at the time of his death was a vice-president of the Royal Society of South Australia. He contributed over 200 papers to various scientific publications.

A species of Australian blind snake, Anilios waitii, is named in his honour.

Further reading
Ichthyology – Edgar Ravenswood Waite at www.amonline.net.au

See also
:Category:Taxa named by Edgar Ravenswood Waite

References

1866 births
1928 deaths
Australian zoologists
Australian ichthyologists
Alumni of the Victoria University of Manchester
People from Leeds
Directors of Canterbury Museum, Christchurch
20th-century New Zealand scientists
20th-century Australian scientists
Scientists from Yorkshire